Karolinum Press is the university press of Charles University in Prague. It was established in 1990, and it has published over 5000 titles since then. Its English-language books are distributed globally by University of Chicago Press, and its e-books are available via ebrary.

Sources
Karolinum Press —website (English-language home page)
Karolinum Press —description at Czech Literature Online

Charles University
University presses of the Czech Republic
1990 establishments in Czechoslovakia
Publishing companies established in 1990